An alternative university (or alternative college) is one that offers an education, and in some cases a lifestyle, that is intentionally not mainstream compared to other institutions. Through the use of experimental and unconventional curricula and offering choice to students as to what and how they will study, such institutions distinguish themselves from traditional faculties. Some of them expand on the concept of democratic education to integrate students in various facets of school administration. Methods of evaluation frequently favor detailed written evaluations instead of grades. Some institutions do not require an SAT/ACT, but rather ask for a series of essays. Many of these institutions are private, though most offer scholarships, grants, and other aid.

Alternative universities, colleges and institutions in the United States
 Antioch College, located in Yellow Springs, Ohio.
 Bard College, located in Annandale-on-Hudson, New York.
 Berea College, located in Berea, Kentucky
 Bennington College, located in Bennington, Vermont.
 California Institute of Integral Studies, located in San Francisco, CA.
 College of the Atlantic, located on Mount Desert Island in Bar Harbor, Maine.
 Deep Springs College, located in California's Deep Springs Valley.
 Dharma Realm Buddhist University, located in Ukiah, California.
 Evergreen State College, located in Olympia, Washington.
 Eugene Lang College, which is part of The New School system and is located in New York City, New York.
 Hampshire College, located in Amherst, Massachusetts.
 Johnston Center for Integrative Studies (formerly Johnston College), at University of Redlands in Redlands, California.
 Goddard College, located in Plainfield, Vermont.
 LIU Global
 Maharishi University of Management, located in Fairfield, Iowa.
 Minerva Schools at KGI, located in San Francisco, California
 New College of Florida, located in Sarasota, Florida.
 Naropa University, located in Boulder, Colorado.
 Pitzer College, located in Claremont, California, a member of the Claremont Colleges.
 Prescott College, located in Prescott, Arizona
 Reed College, located in Portland, Oregon.
 Sarah Lawrence College, located in Yonkers, New York.
 Shimer College, located in Chicago, Illinois.
 Union Institute & University BA Program, located in Montpelier and Brattleboro, Vermont.
 Warren Wilson College, located in Asheville, North Carolina.
 Wayfinding College, located in Portland, Oregon
 Oaksterdam University, located in Oakland, California.

Outside the United States
 CODE University of Applied Sciences, located in Berlin, Germany
 London Interdisciplinary School in London, England
 Det Nødvendige Seminarium, located in Ulfborg, Denmark
 Quest University, located in Squamish, British Columbia, Canada

See also
 Alternative education
 Alternative school
 Education
 Special education
 The Sphere College Project
 Unschooling
 UnCollege

References

Alternative education